Pottawatomie Indian Pay Station is a historic building in St. Marys, Kansas and associated with the Pottawatomie tribe.

It was built of stone in 1855 for use by government agents in paying a regular annuity to Pottawatomie tribe members who had agreed to move from the Great Lakes Region in exchange for reservation land in Kansas. It is the oldest surviving building in the town and county and the oldest part of St. Mary's Mission (Kansas). The building was added to the National Register of Historic Places in 1972.

References

		
National Register of Historic Places in Pottawatomie County, Kansas
Buildings and structures completed in 1855
Potawatomi
Native American history of Kansas